Bob Cooper may refer to:

Sports
 Bob Cooper (racing driver) (born 1935), American NASCAR Cup Series driver
 Bob Cooper (speedway rider) (born 1950), English speedway rider
 Bob Cooper (rower), Australian rower
 Bob Cooper (rugby league) (1955–2022), Australian rugby league player

Other
 Bob Cooper (musician) (1925–1993), American jazz saxophonist
 Bob Cooper (politician) (1936–2004), politician and activist in Northern Ireland
 Bob Cooper (journalist) (born 1954), freelance writer and Runner's World columnist, ultramarathoner
 Bob Cooper (priest) (born 1968), Archdeacon of Sunderland

See also
 Robert Cooper (disambiguation)